The 2017 Volta a la Comunitat Valenciana was a road cycling stage race that took place in the Valencian Community between 1 and 5 February 2017. The race was rated as a 2.1 event as part of the 2017 UCI Europe Tour, and was the 68th edition of the Volta a la Comunitat Valenciana.

The podium was completed by a pair of  riders, having assumed their positions after a first-day team time trial victory; Ben Hermans finished 13 seconds behind Quintana in second, with Manuel Senni finishing third – winning the white jersey for the young rider classification as a result – a further 19 seconds in arrears.

Teams
25 teams were invited to take part in the race. These included twelve UCI WorldTeams, seven UCI Professional Continental teams, five UCI Continental teams and a Spanish national team.

Route

Stages

Stage 1
1 February 2017 — Orihuela to Orihuela, team time trial (TTT)

Stage 2
2 February 2017 — Alicante to Dénia,

Stage 3
3 February 2017 — Canals to Riba-roja de Túria,

Stage 4
4 February 2017 — Segorbe to Llucena,

Stage 5
5 February 2017 — Paterna to Valencia,

Classification leadership table
In the 2017 Volta a la Comunitat Valenciana, five different jerseys were awarded. For the general classification, calculated by adding each cyclist's finishing times on each stage, and allowing time bonuses for the first three finishers at intermediate sprints and at the finish of mass-start stages, the leader received a yellow jersey. This classification was considered the most important of the 2017 Volta a la Comunitat Valenciana, and the winner of the classification was considered the winner of the race.

Additionally, there was a sprints classification, which awarded a green jersey. Points towards the classification were accrued at intermediate sprint points during each stage; these intermediate sprints also offered bonus seconds towards the general classification. There was also a mountains classification, the leadership of which was marked by a red jersey with white polka dots. In the mountains classification, points were won by reaching the top of a climb before other cyclists, with more points available for the higher-categorised climbs.

The fourth jersey represented the young rider classification, marked by a white jersey. This was decided in the same way as the general classification, but only riders born after 1 January 1992 were eligible to be ranked in the classification. There was also a classification for teams, in which the times of the best three cyclists per team on each stage were added together; the leading team at the end of the race was the team with the lowest total time. In addition, there was a combination classification, calculated by adding the numeral ranks of each cyclist in the general, sprints and mountains classifications – a rider must have scored in all classifications possible to qualify for the combination classification – with the lowest cumulative total signifying the winner of this competition.

Notes

References

External links

 

2017
2017 UCI Europe Tour
2017 in Spanish road cycling